Highland Society may refer to:
 Edinburgh University Highland Society
 Royal Highland and Agricultural Society of Scotland, also known as the Highland Society of Edinburgh
 Highland Society of London